Katsina is a village in Kose Parish, Harju County in northern Estonia. Population is 3 as at 2021.

References

Villages in Harju County